Hypercoryphodon is an extinct genus of rhinoceros-sized pantodont native to Late Eocene Mongolia, and was very similar to its ancestor, Coryphodon. Described from a skull, Hypercoryphodon is a quadrupedal hippopotamus-like herbivore that may have been able to adapt its feeding to suit different situations. It is thought to have possibly lived in wetland to forest ecosystems that it might have shared with other herbivores such as dinoceratans like Gobiatherium.

References

External links
Mongolia at Okapiland

Pantodonts
Eocene mammals
Fossils of Mongolia
Fossil taxa described in 1932
Prehistoric mammal genera